Mona Dol (28 May 1901 – 29 December 1990) was a French actress.

Born Amélie Alice Gabrielle Delbart in Lille, she died in Paris in 1990.

Selected filmography
 Lucrezia Borgia (1935)
 The Gardens of Murcia (1936)
 Madame Sans-Gêne (1941)
 Miss Bonaparte (1942)
 The Blue Veil (1942)
 Strange Inheritance (1943)
 First on the Rope (1944)
 Night Shift (1944)
 Boule de suif (1945)
 Dropped from Heaven (1946)
 Pastoral Symphony (1946)
 Messieurs Ludovic (1946)
 The Marriage of Ramuntcho (1947)
 The Bouquinquant Brothers (1947)
 Une si jolie petite plage (1949)
 Thus Finishes the Night (1949)
 Manèges (1950)
 Two Pennies Worth of Violets (1951)
 His Father's Portrait (1953)
 The Fire Within (1963)
 The Adventures of Salavin (1964)

External links

1901 births
1990 deaths
French film actresses
Mass media people from Lille
20th-century French actresses